BC Partners is a British international investment firm with over $40 billion of assets under management across private equity, credit and real estate in Europe and North America. Its global headquarters are in London. The firm invests across all industries. BC Partners was founded in 1986 and has offices in New York, Paris, Milan and Hamburg. Since inception, BC Partners has completed 113 private equity investments in companies with a total enterprise value of €145 billion.

As one of the largest European private equity firms, BC Partners competes for buyouts and investment opportunities with other large cap private equity firms including Blackstone Group, KKR, CVC Capital Partners, Advent International and The Carlyle Group. The firm raised its eighth fund in 2005, which at the time made it the largest European buyout fund. Raised in less than five months, the fund was heavily oversubscribed. Investors in previous funds supplied 90% of the capital. The firm's most recent fund, BC Partners X, was one of the largest buyout funds raised in 2018. Despite its large size, the firm is known for its operational efficiency, boasting an incredibly high amount of assets under management per investment professional.

BC Partners was until recently majority shareholder of Intelsat, the global satellite services provider valued at US$16.6 billion in its leveraged buyout in 2007—one of the largest private equity buyouts of all time led by a consortium of investors including BC Partners and Silver Lake Partners. In 2008, BC Partners replaced Intelsat's chairman with Raymond Svider, BC's New York-based co-chairman. Sometime between 2008 and 2018, BC Partners sold all of Intelsat to the company.

History
The firm, founded in 1986 as Baring Capital Investors Ltd. by Otto van der Wyck, who was also a co-founder of CVC Capital Partners.  Originally, BC Partners was formed by Barings to advise funds providing development capital, in particular for management buyouts. John Burgess joined him from Candover, the US and UK buyout house, a month after. The principals of Baring Capital Investors completed a spinout of what would become BC Partners following the collapse of Barings in 1995.  Van der Wyck left the firm in 2001, and has held senior roles with firms including Coller Capital, Climate Change Capital and AlpInvest Partners.

Significant transactions

As of December 31, 2019, BC Partners portfolio includes 114 companies with aggregate sales revenue of €145 billion. BC Partners can commit over $2.75 billion (€2.0 billion) of equity to any single transaction. The firm's most successful and profitable realized investments include General Healthcare (leading acute care hospital provider and independent provider of psychiatric care), C&C Group plc (leading seller of alcoholic and non-alcoholic beverages), Galbani (market-leading cheese company) and Phones 4u (leading mobile phone provider in the UK - until its bankruptcy in September 2014).

In June 2013, BC Partners agreed to buy German publisher Springer Science+Business Media for about 3.3 billion euros.

BC Partners revealed in January 2015 that it would sell its 40.25 percent stake in its supermarket chain Migros Türk to the Turkish conglomerate Anadolu Endustri Holding AS for around $2.74 billion.

In June 2019 Chewy, which was acquired by BC Partners in 2017, and is the online pet retailer division of PetSmart, announced its IPO on the NYSE when it was valued at $8.8 billion.

In 2019, BC Partners announced their backing for the acquisition (via the United Group) of Vivacom, the largest Bulgarian telecom. The acquisition became an issue of the media and legal dispute with the company's previous owner, Empreno Ventures, which asked BC Partners to wait until judicial resolution.

On November 7, BC Partners was added to a lawsuit by Empreno seeking to ban the sale of Vivacom.

In early 2021, the firm entered into talks with Inter Milan owner Suning about potentially buying the football club.

References

External links

Private equity firms of the United Kingdom
Financial services companies established in 1986
1986 establishments in the United Kingdom